|}

The Scarbrough Stakes is a Listed flat horse race in Great Britain open to horses aged two years or older. It is run at Doncaster Racecourse over a distance of 5 furlongs and 3 yards (1,008 metres), and it is scheduled to take place each year in September. It is currently held on the first day of Doncaster's four-day St. Leger Festival meeting.

Records
Most successful horse since 1983 (2 wins):
 Notley – 1991, 1992
Celtic Mill – 2004, 2006
Galeota – 2007, 2008

Leading jockey since 1983 (5 wins):
 Ryan Moore – Galeota (2007, 2008), Encore D'Or (2017), Equilateral (2019), Manaccan (2022)

Leading trainer since 1983 (4 wins):
 Richard Hannon Sr. – Notley (1991, 1992), Galeota (2007, 2008)

Winners since 1983

See also
 Horse racing in Great Britain
 List of British flat horse races

References
 Paris-Turf: 
 Racing Post:

Flat races in Great Britain
Doncaster Racecourse
Open sprint category horse races